The 1958 USAC Road Racing Championship season was the inaugural season of the USAC Road Racing Championship.  The series was contested for sports cars at three rounds (Lime Rock, Marlboro, and Riverside), and Formula Libre at one round (Watkins Glen).  It began September 7, 1958, and ended October 12, 1958, after four races.  Dan Gurney won the season championship.

Calendar

Season results

External links
World Sports Racing Prototypes: 1958 USAC Road Racing Championship
Racing Sports Cars: USAC Road Racing Championship archive

USAC Road Racing Championship
Usac Road Racing